Oceanside may refer to:

Places

United States
Oceanside, California
 Oceanside Transit Center
Oceanside, New York
 Oceanside station (LIRR)
Oceanside, Oregon

Other places
Oceanside, New South Wales, Australia
Oceanside, British Columbia, Canada

Other uses
MiraCosta College, formerly called Oceanside-Carlsbad Junior College
Oceanside Ice Arena, ice arena in Tempe, Arizona
, American warship

See also